IPS (in-plane switching) is a screen technology for liquid-crystal displays (LCDs). In IPS, a layer of liquid crystals is sandwiched between two glass surfaces. The liquid crystal molecules are aligned parallel to those surfaces in predetermined directions (in-plane). The molecules are reoriented by an applied electric field, whilst remaining essentially parallel to the surfaces to produce an image. It was designed to solve the strong viewing angle dependence and low-quality color reproduction of the twisted nematic field effect (TN) matrix LCDs prevalent in the late 1980s.

History 

The TN method was the only viable technology for active matrix TFT LCDs in the late 1980s and early 1990s. Early panels showed grayscale inversion from up to down, and had a high response time (for this kind of transition, 1 ms is visually better than 5 ms). In the mid-1990s new technologies were developed—typically IPS and Vertical Alignment (VA)—that could resolve these weaknesses and were applied to large computer monitor panels.

One approach patented in 1974 was to use inter-digitated electrodes on one glass substrate only to produce an electric field essentially parallel to the glass substrates. However, the inventor was not yet able to implement such IPS-LCDs superior to TN displays.

After thorough analysis, details of advantageous molecular arrangements were filed in Germany by Guenter Baur et al. and patented in various countries including the US on 9 January 1990. The Fraunhofer Society in Freiburg, where the inventors worked, assigned these patents to Merck KGaA, Darmstadt, Germany.

Shortly thereafter, Hitachi of Japan filed patents to improve this technology. A leader in this field was Katsumi Kondo, who worked at the Hitachi Research Center. In 1992, engineers at Hitachi worked out various practical details of the IPS technology to interconnect the thin-film transistor array as a matrix and to avoid undesirable stray fields in between pixels. Hitachi also improved the viewing angle dependence further by optimizing the shape of the electrodes (Super IPS). NEC and Hitachi became early manufacturers of active-matrix addressed LCDs based on the IPS technology. This is a milestone for implementing large-screen LCDs having acceptable visual performance for flat-panel computer monitors and television screens. In 1996, Samsung developed the optical patterning technique that enables multi-domain LCD. Multi-domain and in-plane switching subsequently remain the dominant LCD designs through 2006.

Later, LG Display and other South Korean, Japanese, and Taiwanese LCD manufacturers adapted IPS technology.

IPS technology is widely used in panels for TVs, tablet computers, and smartphones. In particular, most IBM products was marketed as Flexview from 2004 to 2008 has an IPS LCDs with CCFL backlighting, and all Apple Inc. products marketed with the label Retina Display feature IPS LCDs with LED backlighting since 2010.

Technology

Implementation
In this case, both linear polarizing filters P and A have their axes of transmission in the same direction. To obtain the 90 degree twisted nematic structure of the LC layer between the two glass plates without an applied electric field (OFF state), the inner surfaces of the glass plates are treated to align the bordering LC molecules at a right angle. This molecular structure is practically the same as in TN LCDs. However, the arrangement of the electrodes e1 and e2 is different. Because they are in the same plane and on a single glass plate, they generate an electric field essentially parallel to this plate. The diagram is not to scale: the LC layer is only a few micrometers thick and so is very small compared with the distance between the electrodes.

The LC molecules have a positive dielectric anisotropy and align themselves with their long axis parallel to an applied electrical field. In the OFF state (shown on the left), entering light L1 becomes linearly polarized by polarizer P. The twisted nematic LC layer rotates the polarization axis of the passing light by 90 degrees, so that ideally no light passes through polarizer A. In the ON state, a sufficient voltage is applied between electrodes and a corresponding electrical field E is generated that realigns the LC molecules as shown on the right of the diagram. Here, light L2 can pass through polarizer A.

In practice, other schemes of implementation exist with a different structure of the LC molecules for example without any twist in the OFF state. As both electrodes are on the same substrate, they take more space than TN matrix electrodes. This also reduces contrast and brightness.

Super-IPS was later introduced with better response times and colour reproduction.

Advantages 
 IPS panels display consistent, accurate color from all viewing angles. A state-of-the-art (2014) comparison of IPS vs. TN panels concerning colour consistency under different viewing angles can be seen on the website of Japan Display Inc.
 Unlike TN LCDs, IPS panels do not lighten or show tailing when touched. This is important for touch-screen devices, such as smartphones and tablet computers.
 IPS panels offer clear images, stable response time and better coloring.

Disadvantages 
 IPS panels require up to 15% more power than TN panels.
 IPS panels are more expensive to produce than TN panels.
 IPS panels have slower/longer response times than TN panels.
 IPS panels are sometimes vulnerable to a defect called backlight bleeding.

Alternative technologies

Plane to Line Switching (PLS)
Toward the end of 2010 Samsung Electronics introduced Super PLS (Plane-to-Line Switching) with the intent of providing an alternative to the popular IPS technology which is primarily manufactured by LG Display. It is an "IPS-type" panel technology, and is very similar in performance features, specs and characteristics to LG Display's offering. Samsung adopted PLS panels instead of AMOLED panels, because in the past AMOLED panels had difficulties in realizing full HD resolution on mobile devices. PLS technology was Samsung's wide-viewing angle LCD technology, similar to LG Display's IPS technology.

Samsung asserted the following benefits of Super PLS (commonly referred to as just "PLS") over IPS:
 Further improvement in viewing angle
 10 percent increase in brightness
 Up to 15 percent decrease in production costs
 Increased image quality
 Flexible panel

Advanced Hyper-Viewing Angle (AHVA)

In 2012 AU Optronics began investment in their own IPS-type technology, dubbed AHVA. This should not be confused with their long standing AMVA technology (which is a VA-type technology). Performance and specs remained very similar to LG Display's IPS and Samsung's PLS offerings. The first 144 Hz compatible IPS-type panels were produced in late 2014 (used first in early 2015) by AUO, beating Samsung and LG Display to providing high refresh rate IPS-type panels.

Manufacturers 
 AU Optronics
 Acer
 BOE
 Chi Mei Optoelectronics
 Japan Display Inc.
 LG Display (mentioned as largest supplier of IPS LCDs in 2012)
 Newhaven Display
 Panasonic Liquid Crystal Display Co., Ltd
 Samsung Display
 Sony Professional Display

See also 
 Computer monitor
 e-paper
 LCD TV
 Liquid-crystal display
 Smart watch
 TFT LCD

References

External links 

 Panel Technologies
 IPS vs. VA Panel
Full Form of IPS Display 

Display technology
Liquid crystal displays
German inventions
Japanese inventions
South Korean inventions

de:Flüssigkristallbildschirm#In-Plane Switching (IPS)